In Greek mythology, Tiasa (Ancient Greek: Τίασα) was a Naiad nymph of a river near Amyclae, Sparta. She was a Laconian princess as the daughter of King Eurotas and Cleta, and thus sister of Sparta. 

By the river Tiasa was situated a temple of Cleta and Phaenna, the two Charites recognized in Sparta, which was purported to have been founded by Lacedaemon.

Notes

References 
Athenaeus of Naucratis, The Deipnosophists or Banquet of the Learned. London. Henry G. Bohn, York Street, Covent Garden. 1854. Online version at the Perseus Digital Library.
Athenaeus of Naucratis, Deipnosophistae. Kaibel. In Aedibus B.G. Teubneri. Lipsiae. 1887. Greek text available at the Perseus Digital Library.
Pausanias, Description of Greece with an English Translation by W.H.S. Jones, Litt.D., and H.A. Ormerod, M.A., in 4 Volumes. Cambridge, MA, Harvard University Press; London, William Heinemann Ltd. 1918. . Online version at the Perseus Digital Library

Naiads
Nymphs
Princesses in Greek mythology
Laconian characters in Greek mythology
Laconian mythology